The king of the Hashemite Kingdom of Jordan is Jordan's head of state and monarch. He serves as the head of the Jordanian monarchy—the Hashemite dynasty. The king is addressed as His Majesty.

Jordan is a constitutional monarchy. However, the king is vested with somewhat more executive and legislative power than is typically the case for constitutional monarchs. He is commander-in-chief of the Jordanian Armed Forces and appoints the Prime Minister of Jordan and the directors of security agencies. He also appoints the members of the upper house, the Senate, as well as the members of the Constitutional Court.

The current king, Abdullah II, took the throne on 7 February 1999 following the death of his father, Hussein.

History

The sons of Hussein bin Ali, the Grand Emir and Sharif of Mecca were set up as the kings of Iraq and Jordan in the aftermath of the Arab Revolt and World War I.

The Jordanian monarchy was set up in 1921, with Abdullah I becoming Emir of the Emirate of Transjordan, a post he held from 11 April 1921 until Transjordan gained independence on 25 May 1946 as the Hashemite Kingdom of Transjordan. Once independence was gained, Abdullah was crowned the country's first monarch. The country's name was shortened to the Hashemite Kingdom of Jordan on 26 April 1949, after the kingdom won control of both sides of the Jordan River as a result of the 1948 Arab–Israeli War.

Succession

Monarchs of Jordan (1921–present)

Emirate of Transjordan (1921–1946)

Hashemite Kingdom of Jordan (1946–present)

Timeline

Royal Standard

See also
 History of Jordan
 Royal Hashemite Court
 Crown Prince of Jordan
 List of Jordanian royal consorts
 List of Sunni dynasties

References

External links
 The Official Website of the King

Jordan
List
 
Lists of Jordanian people
Modern history of Jordan
1946 establishments in Jordan